Corvino San Quirico is a comune (municipality) in the Province of Pavia in the Italian region Lombardy, located about 50 km south of Milan and about 20 km south of Pavia. As of 31 December 2004, it had a population of 1,084 and an area of 4.4 km².

Corvino San Quirico borders the following municipalities: Calvignano, Casatisma, Casteggio, Oliva Gessi, Robecco Pavese, Torricella Verzate.

Demographic evolution

References

Cities and towns in Lombardy